Twelve ships of the French Navy have borne the name Mutine ("Mischievous"):

Ships 
 , a 14-gun frigate
 , an experimental armoured ship
 , a 28-gun  light frigate.
 , a 40-gun ship of the line.
 , a 24-gun .
 , a 12-gun  gun-brig .
 , an 18-gun corvette, lead ship of her two-vessel class.  destroyed her near Santiago de Cuba on 17 August 1803.
 , a  brig-schooner.
  (1885), an  steamer gunboat.
 , a hulk, was named Mutine during her career.
  (1945), a patrol boat on Lake Constance, captured from the Germans.

See also

Notes and references

Notes

References

Bibliography 
 
 

French Navy ship names